Mihajlo Pjanović (born 13 February 1977) is a Serbian former footballer who played as a striker.

Club career
Pjanović started his senior career with Javor Ivanjica, before moving to OFK Beograd. He earned himself a transfer to Red Star Belgrade in the 1999 winter transfer window. During his tenure with the Crveno-beli, Pjanović won two national championships (2000 and 2001) and three national cups (1999, 2000, and 2002). He totaled 111 league appearances and scored 80 goals, before moving to Spartak Moscow in the summer of 2003. At the age of 30, Pjanović finished his playing career with Rostov.

International career
At international level, Pjanović made five appearances for the national team of FR Yugoslavia between 2000 and 2002.

Honours
Red Star Belgrade
 First League of FR Yugoslavia: 1999–2000, 2000–01
 FR Yugoslavia Cup: 1998–99, 1999–2000, 2001–02

Notes

References

External links
 
 

Association football forwards
Expatriate footballers in Russia
FC Rostov players
FC Spartak Moscow players
First League of Serbia and Montenegro players
FK Javor Ivanjica players
OFK Beograd players
People from Prijepolje
Red Star Belgrade footballers
Russian Premier League players
Serbia and Montenegro expatriate footballers
Serbia and Montenegro expatriate sportspeople in Russia
Serbia and Montenegro footballers
Serbia and Montenegro international footballers
Serbia and Montenegro under-21 international footballers
Serbian expatriate footballers
Serbian expatriate sportspeople in Russia
Serbian footballers
1977 births
Living people